Bay View is an unincorporated community in Cecil County, Maryland, United States. Bay View is located at the intersection of Maryland routes 272 and 274, north of North East. Cecil College and Gilpin's Falls Covered Bridge are both located in Bay View.

References

Unincorporated communities in Cecil County, Maryland
Unincorporated communities in Maryland